Harold Brodkey (October 25, 1930 – January 26, 1996), born Aaron Roy Weintraub, was an American short-story writer and novelist.

Life
Brodkey was the second child born in Staunton, Illinois, to Max Weintraub and Celia Glazer Weintraub (1899-1932); Samuel Weintraub (1928-2017) was their oldest child. He was Jewish. When their birth mother Celia died, Samuel Weintraub was four and old enough to remain with his father but Aaron Weintraub, only two years old, was adopted by his father's cousin, Doris Rubenstein Brodkey (1896-1949) and her husband, Joseph Brodkey (1896-1946) and renamed Harold Roy Brodkey. Doris and Joseph lived in University City, Missouri, with their daughter, Marilyn Ruth Brodkey (1923-2011). Brodkey would chronicle his life with his adoptive parents and sister in his short stories and his novel, The Runaway Soul.

After graduating from Harvard University with an A.B. cum laude in 1952, Brodkey married his first wife, Joanna Brown, a Radcliffe graduate and, in 1953 their only child, Ann Emily Brodkey was born. With the aid of his editor, William Maxwell, a childhood friend of his wife, Brodkey began his writing career by contributing short stories to The New Yorker and other magazines. His stories received two first-place O. Henry Awards. Brodkey was a staff writer for The New Yorker until the end of his life.

In 1993 he announced in The New Yorker that he had contracted AIDS; he later wrote This Wild Darkness: The Story of My Death (1996), about his battle with the disease. At the time of his death in 1996, he was living in New York City with his second wife, novelist Ellen Brodkey (née Schwamm). Brodkey contracted the HIV virus from a homosexual relationship, though he reportedly did not consider himself to be gay.

The author is most famous for his breathtaking conversational skills, his progressively more complex text and for taking 32 years to complete his much anticipated first novel, published in 1991 as The Runaway Soul.

Literary career 
Brodkey's career began promisingly with the short-story collection First Love and Other Sorrows, which received widespread critical praise at the time of its 1958 publication.

Six years later he signed a book contract with Random House for his first novel, tentatively titled "A Party of Animals" (it was also referred to as "The Animal Corner"). The unfinished novel was subsequently resold to Farrar, Straus & Giroux in 1970, then to Knopf in '79. As a Paris Review interview noted, "The work became something of an object of desire for editors; it was moved among publishing houses for what were rumored to be ever-increasing advances, advertised as a forthcoming title (Party of Animals) in book catalogs, expanded and ceaselessly revised, until its publication seemed an event longer awaited than anything without theological implications." In 1983 the Saturday Review referred to "A Party of Animals" as "now reportedly comprising 4,000 pages and announced as forthcoming 'next year' every year since 1973."

During this period, Brodkey published a number of stories, most of them in The New Yorker, that dealt with a set of recurring characters—the evidently autobiographical Wiley Silenowicz and his adoptive family—and which were announced as fragments of the novel. His editor at Knopf, Gordon Lish, called the novel in progress "the one necessary American narrative work of this century." Literary critic Harold Bloom declared: "If he's ever able to solve his publishing problems, he'll be seen as one of the great writers of his day."

In addition to publishing, Brodkey earned a living during this period by writing television pilot scripts for NBC, and teaching at Cornell University. Three long stories from "A Party of Animals" were collected in Women and Angels (1985), and a larger number, including those three, appeared in 1988's Stories in an Almost Classical Mode. Brodkey had apparently decided to omit them from the novel, for when, in 1991, he published The Runaway Soul, a very long novel (835 pages) dramatizing Wiley's early life, no material from Stories in an Almost Classical Mode was included. The novel seems to be either "A Party of Animals" under a new title or the first volume of an eventual multivolume work. Brodkey made some comments that suggested the latter.

Brodkey's second novel, Profane Friendship, appeared in 1994.

Criticism
From the beginning of his career, Brodkey accrued detractors. Reviewing First Love for The Christian Science Monitor, Melvin Maddocks wrote that "a sense of vital, untampered-with conflict is missing. These stories seem too patly, too cautiously worked out. They are Japanese-garden fiction with every pebble in place." A critic for The Atlantic Monthly similarly complained that Brodkey "appears to be the kind of artist committed to working in the minor key which The New Yorker has made fashionable."

Kirkus Reviews called  Stories in an Almost Classical Mode an "endless kvetch." In The New Criterion, Bruce Bawer found the book's tone to be "extraordinarily arrogant and self-obsessed." He further wrote, "Brodkey is so fixated upon the tragic memories of his childhood and youth that he has virtually no sense of proportion about them. In one story after another, he offers up pages of gratuitous detail, straining, it seems, to squeeze every last drop of significance out of every last inane particular." Later, in assessing The Runaway Soul, Bawer wrote, "The plain fact is that 99 percent of the prose here is gawky, aimless, repetitive, murky, and pretentious—and there are few more unenviable literary experiences than having to read over eight hundred pages of it." He concluded that the novel was "one of the literary fiascos of all time."

"Entering The Runaway Soul," wrote Christopher Lehmann-Haupt in The New York Times, "is like arriving at a monthlong house party and being accosted at the door by your host, who sticks his mouth in your face and begins to talk." Lehmann-Haupt found the book to be replete with "bogus philosophizing" and "paradoxical non-art," with prose that was "verbose, repetitive, overstuffed with adverbs, of questionable sense, tedious and just plain ugly." In The American Scholar, Michael Dirda criticized the novel's "consummate, unmitigated tedium."

Regarding This Wild Darkness, Brenda Bracker in The Baltimore Sun criticized the "long and self-indulgent stretches of the author's much-touted mystical prose" and wrote that "watching Brodkey watch himself die by inches becomes, ultimately, tedious."

Several weeks after Brodkey announced in The New Yorker in 1993 that he was suffering from AIDS, the Pulitzer Prize-winning poet Richard Howard wrote in The New Republic that the disclosure was "a matter of manipulative hucksterism, of mendacious self-propaganda and cruel assertion of artistic privilege, whereby death is made a matter of public relations."

In reviewing Brodkey's essay collection Sea Battles on Dry Land for The New York Times, Wendy Steiner wrote that although the anthology "does contain some very good sentences," others were "unspeakable," e.g. "'A car simply is too weak and too complex to be a good symbol, since neither does it plow, and it does not weep either." Moreover, "Brodkey's philosophizing alternates between deconstruction-rivaling nonsense and delusional pieties." Kirkus Reviews complained that in these "self-involved, prolix" essays, "Brodkey seems to be parodying both himself and The New Yorker." Among the offending examples cited were "a superannuated New Journalism style piece on the Academy Awards," "pompously irrelevant analyses of the 1992 presidential campaign," and "preciously insubstantial vignettes" for The New Yorker's "Talk of the Town" section. "If, for some reason, you consider yourself a New York intellectual, Sea Battles on Dry Land might encourage you to secede from the tribe," wrote Susie Linfield in her review of the book for The New York Observer. "When [Brodkey] is bad, he is very, very bad, and he is very, very bad quite often. Sea Battles is filled with whoppers: misstatements, overstatements, nonstatements and statements that are silly, false or incomprehensible."

Bibliography

Short-story collections 
 First Love and Other Sorrows (1958)
 Women and Angels (1985) (3 stories, all later included in his 1988 collection).
 Stories in an Almost Classical Mode (1988)
 The World is the Home of Love and Death (1997)

Novels 
 The Runaway Soul (1991)
 Profane Friendship (1994)

Non-fiction 
 This Wild Darkness: The Story of My Death (1996)
 My Venice (1998)
 Sea Battles on Dry Land: Essays (1999)

References

External links
 Jonathan Baskin, "Fading Fast," Bookforum  
Harold Brodkey resources on the Web
"People: Harold Brodkey", The New York Times
 

1930 births
1996 deaths
20th-century American novelists
20th-century American male writers
20th-century American memoirists
Cornell University faculty
O. Henry Award winners
Novelists from Illinois
Novelists from Missouri
Novelists from New York (state)
Harvard Advocate alumni
People from Staunton, Illinois
People from St. Louis County, Missouri
AIDS-related deaths in New York (state)
Jewish American novelists
American male novelists
American male short story writers
20th-century American short story writers
American male non-fiction writers
20th-century American Jews